is a Japanese footballer who plays for Nagano Parceiro.

Club statistics
Updated to 23 February 2017.

References

External links

Profile at Kagoshima United FC

1989 births
Living people
Tokyo Gakugei University alumni
Association football people from Kanagawa Prefecture
Japanese footballers
J2 League players
J3 League players
Japan Football League players
Giravanz Kitakyushu players
Kagoshima United FC players
AC Nagano Parceiro players
Association football goalkeepers